Dedekind is a German surname. Notable people with the surname include:

Brendon Dedekind (born 1976), South African swimmer
Constantin Christian Dedekind (1628–1715), German poet, dramatist and composer
Friedrich Dedekind (1524–1598), German humanist, theologian, and bookseller
Katja Dedekind (born 2001), Australian Paralympic swimmer and goalball player
Richard Dedekind (1831–1916), German mathematician
19293 Dedekind, asteroid named after Richard Dedekind

German-language surnames